Deadman's Bluff is an adventure module published in 2000 for Cutthroat: The Shadow Wars roleplaying game.  It's the first (and last) of the "Quest Series" product line and its StormWorld Games product code is 2002. This module was developed and intended for use with Cutthroat: The Shadow Wars.

Credits
Nathan Kaylor, Design, Graphic Design
Jason Walton, Cover artist
Jason Walton, Nathan Kaylor, Interior artists

Plot summary
After an ancient evil is awakened by a foolhardy tomb robber, the characters are forced to set things right by braving deadly traps and hideous monsters in the glacial caverns north of Skaev known as Deadman's Bluff. Designed as an adventure module for novice characters.

Fantasy role-playing game adventures
Role-playing game supplements introduced in 2000